The 1972 UEFA European Under-23 Championship, which spanned two years (1970–72) had 23 entrants. Czechoslovakia U-23s won the competition.

The 23 national teams were divided into eight groups. The group winners played off against each other on a two-legged home-and-away basis until the winner was decided.  There was no finals tournament or 3rd-place playoff.

Qualifying stage

Draw
The allocation of teams into qualifying groups was based on that of UEFA Euro 1972 qualifying tournament with several changes, reflecting the absence of some nations:
 Group 2 and 8 had the same competing nations
 Group 1 did not include Wales
 Group 3 did not include England and Malta
 Group 4 did not include Northern Ireland and Cyprus
 Group 5 did not include Belgium and Scotland
 Group 6 did not include Republic of Ireland
 Group 7 did not include Luxembourg

Group 1

Group 2

Group 3

Group 4

Group 5

Group 6

Group 7

Group 8

Knockout stages

See also
 UEFA European Under-21 Championship

External links
 RSSSF Results Archive at rsssf.com

UEFA European Under-21 Championship
1970–71 in European football
1971–72 in European football
1972 in youth association football